Musgrave Lewthwaite Watson (24 January 1804 – 28 October 1847) was an English sculptor of the early 19th century.

Life

Watson was born on 24 January 1804 the son of Thomas Watson of the Bogs, Sebergham, a farm near Carlisle in Cumberland, being christened on 8 March 1804 at Hawksdale, near Dalston. His father was a prosperous farmer, who also owned an iron-forge. Although he had artistic ambitions from an early age, at his parents' insistence he was articled to a solicitor in Carlisle in 1821. Following his fathers's death in 1823, he abandoned the legal profession and went to London to study sculpture. He took advice from John Flaxman, and studied under Robert William Sevier and at the Royal Academy. In 1825 he left for Rome. On his return in 1828 he was determined to set up as a sculptor on his own account, rather than work in another artist's studio. However financial difficulties forced him to seek employment with Sir Francis Chantrey. He  argued with Chantrey and afterwards worked for Richard Westmacott, William Behnes and Edward Hodges Baily.  According to his biographer, Henry Lonsdale, he then spent two years at the Coade Artificial Stone Works in Lambeth, where he modelled sculptures and friezes for both private and public buildings. The work was well paid, but he decided to leave and set up his own studio once more.

He fell into financial difficulties again, and in 1832 had his belongings distrained for rent. However, eventually circumstances improved: a  stone frieze for Edward Moxhay's Hall of Commerce in Threadneedle Street in the City of London, completed in 1842, brought him critical acclaim. Five and a half feet tall and seventy three feet long, it can now be seen in Napier Terrace, Islington. In the same year he received  a lucrative commission  from Lord Eldon for a marble double portrait of his grandfather, the first Lord Eldon, and his great-uncle, Baron Stowell. The commission had originally been given to Sir Francis Chantrey, who  died before it could be carried out.

In 1839 Watson submitted designs to  both competitions held by the Nelson Memorial Committee for a monument to be erected in Trafalgar Square. He was unsuccessful, but was later chosen to sculpt  the relief panel of the Battle of Cape St. Vincent on the pedestal of the winning entry, William Railton's Nelson's Column. He was, however, unhappy with the terms of the commission, writing in a letter " I think the world will be disappointed with the relievi. The subjects are unfit for sculpture, or at least unfavourable." Watson died before the Cape St Vincent relief could be finished, having suffered from a persistent heart condition for most of his adult life. He also left the Eldon sculpture and a statue of John Flaxman to be completed by others. Just before his death he had  most of the models in his studio destroyed.

he died of heart disease on the 28th October 1847 at his home at 13 Upper Gloucester Place in London. He was buried on the western side of Highgate Cemetery. The grave (no.2444) has no headstone or marker.

Recognition

A memorial to Musgrave Watson was erected in Carlisle Cathedral.

Family

He lived with a young woman, the daughter of a publican in Carlisle, but never married her. It is unclear if he had children.

Works
Double portrait of brothers Lord Eldon and Lord Stowell at University College, Oxford (1842).
Statue of Queen Elizabeth I for the Royal Exchange, London (1844).
Marble statues of Major Francis Aglionby, MP for East Cumberland, (1843)  and Lord Lonsdale (1845) in Carlisle.
Statue of John Flaxman for University College London (1847).
Pedimental sculpture for the Victoria Rooms in Bristol.
Frieze from Edward Moxhay's Hall of Commerce in the City of London; Installed in Napier Terrace Islington in 1975.

References

Bibliography

1804 births
1847 deaths
Burials at Highgate Cemetery
English sculptors
English male sculptors
People from Dalston, Cumbria
19th-century British sculptors